Destination XYZ is Callalily's debut mainstream album released on July 17, 2006 by Musiko Records & Sony BMG Music Entertainment (Philippines), Inc.. It contains the singles "Stars", "Take My Hand", the breakthrough single "Magbalik", "Pasan","Sanctuary" and the radio single "Dream".

The album officially marked their success as OPM artists and gained applause in the Philippine music industry, forming a huge fanbase called 'Callalistas'. The album itself contains 12 tracks, and the singles off of the album proved a success.

Track listing

References

2006 albums
Callalily albums